Quercus Cabo Verde is a Capeverdean branch of the Portuguese environmental organization Quercus.  It is headquartered in the capital city of Praia.  Its logo features the grey-headed kingfisher.  The first and current head is Paulo Ferreira.

Quercus Cabo Verde is the first independent environmental organization in the country.

History
The organization was prepared on February 17, 2016 at 6:00 PM for the first time to the public at the National Assembly of the national parliament.  João Branco, president of the Portuguese environmental group Quercus was guest and gave a welcoming address.

The Capeverdean Ministry of Environment also supported the organization, minister Antero Veiga welcomed this initiative to help develop the environmental protection in Cape Verde.

Objectives
The objectives are aimed to protecting the environment including naming threats to nature and environment in the islands and waste reduction.  It also promotes renewable energy.

See also
List of companies of Cape Verde
List of environmental organizations

References

External links
Official website
Video of the Press Conference of Quercus Cabo Verde, RTC - TCV via sapo.cv

Organizations based in Praia
Environmental organizations based in Cape Verde
2016 establishments in Cape Verde